List of flower bulbs is a list of flowering plants which come from ornamental bulbs. Most flower bulbs produce perennial flowers and in cold zones the bulbs are left in the ground year-round.

Bulb planting
Flowering plant bulbs are planted beneath the surface of the earth. The bulbs need some exposure to cold temperatures for 12 to 14 weeks in order to bloom. Flower bulbs are generally planted in the fall in colder climates. The bulbs go dormant in the winter but they continue to absorb water and nutrients from the soil and they develop roots. Most bulbs produce perennial flowers. Occasionally certain bulbs become crowded in the ground and they must be removed and separated. These include: amaryllis (Hippeastrum spp.) and cyclamen (Cyclamen persicum).

Warm weather
Some flower bulbs do well in hot climates: Lillies, Caladiums, Dahlias, Gladiolus, Narcissus (plant) and daffodils. To grow cold weather flower bulbs like Tulips and crocus in hot climates, gardeners must dig up the bulbs and store them in the cold for 3-4 months before replanting.

A
Allium siculum
Agapanthus (Blue White and Dwarf)
Albuca nelsonii
Allium tuberosum 
Alocasia (Elephants Ears)
Alstroemeria (Peruvian Lily)
Amarcrinum (Amaryllis x Crinum)
Amaryllis belladonna
Amorphophallus
Anemone (Wood Anemone)
Anomatheca
Anthericum (St Bernards Lily)
Arisaema
Arum
Asarum

B
Babiana (Baboon Flower)
Begonia
Bletilla (Chinese Ground Orchid)
Boophone
Brunsvigia
Bulbinella

C
Caladium
Calochortus
Cardiocrinum giganteum (Giant Himalayan Lily)
Chlidanthus
Scilla luciliae
Colocasia (Elephants Ears)
Convallaria (Lily of the Valley)
Crinum
Crocosmia
Crocus
Cyclamen
Curtonus

D
Dahlia Tubers
Daffodils
Disporopsis
Dracunculus vulgaris
Dodecatheon (Shooting Stars)

E
Eremurus (Foxtail Lily)
Eucomis (Pineapple Lily)
Ferraria
Freesia
Fritillaria

G
Galanthus (Snowdrops)
Galtonia (summer hyacinth)
Gladiolus
Gloriosa (plant) (Glory lily)
Gloxinia

H
Habenaria (Egret orchid or Bog Orchid)
Hedychium (Ginger Lily)
Hesperantha (Evening Flower)
Hippeastrum
Hyacinth
Hymenocallis (Spider Lily)

I
Incarvillea (Garden Gloxinia)
Iris
Ixia

J
Jonquils

L
Leucojum (Snowflakes)
Liatris (Blazing Star or Gay Feather)
Lilium (Asiatic)
Littonia
Lycoris

M
Mirabilis (Four o’clock flower)
Muscari

N
Narcissus (plant)
Nerine

O
Ornithogalum
Oxalis

P
Pasithea
Pleione (Rockery Orchid)
Polianthes (Tuberosa)
Puschkinia

R
Ranunculus
Rhodohypoxis

S
Sandersonia
Sauromatum
Scadoxus
Schizostylis (Kaffir Lilies)
Scilla
Sparaxis (Harlequin Flower)
Sprekelia (Jacobean Lily)
Sternbergia (Winter Daffodil)

T
Tacca (Bat Plant)
Tigridia
Trillium
Triteleia
Tropaeolum
Tulbaghia
Tulip

U
Uvularia

Z
Zantedeschia
Zephyranthes

Other
In addition to flowers, some vegetables have bulbs and they include, garlic, Onions and shallots. Some other plant roots which bear a similarity to bulbs include: corms, tubers, tuberous roots and rhizomes.

See also
Ornamental bulbous plant

References

External links 
New York Botanical Garden: "Bulb Care and Selection"

Flowers
Flowers
Plant morphology
Horticulture
Lists of plants